General elections were held in Denmark on 23 October 1979. The Social Democratic Party remained the largest in the Folketing, with 68 of the 179 seats. Voter turnout was 86% in Denmark proper, 65% in the Faroe Islands and 50% in Greenland.

Results

References

Elections in Denmark
Denmark
1979 elections in Denmark
October 1979 events in Europe